C (stylized as 「C」) is the debut studio album by Japanese entertainer Miho Nakayama. Released through King Records on August 21, 1985, the album features Nakayama's debut single "C".

The album peaked at No. 11 on Oricon's albums chart and sold over 90,000 copies.

Track listing

Charts

References

External links
 
 
 

1985 debut albums
Miho Nakayama albums
Japanese-language albums
King Records (Japan) albums